J. T. Mahajan College of Engineering is located in Faizpur, Maharashtra, India. It was established by the Technical and Medical Education Society in 1984.Initially it was known as TMES College of Engineering as it was operated by a trust named Technical & medical Education Society. It is at the midway (approx.) of the villages Faizpur and Nhavi, near the Madhukar Sehkari Sakhar Karkhana.

External links
College website

Engineering colleges in Maharashtra
Jalgaon district
Educational institutions established in 1984
1984 establishments in Maharashtra